John Lysaght, 2nd Baron Lisle of Mountnorth was a member of the English aristocracy living in what is now the Republic of Ireland.

Born in 1729 to the first Baron Lisle, and Catherine, daughter of Joseph Deane, by Margaret Boyle. Lysaght was educated at Trinity College, Dublin. He was selected to the Whig parliaments as MP for Castlemartyr in 1753. He was appointed High Sheriff for County Cork in 1757.

After the accession of George III in 1760 to the English and Irish thrones, Lysaght was elected as a 'knight of the shire' MP for County Cork for three years in 1765.

In 1778, Lysaght married Mary Anne Connor, the daughter of George Connor of Ballybracken in County Cork.

The couple had two sons and two daughters:
 John Lysaght, 3rd Baron Lisle, married Sarah, eldest daughter of William Gibb of Inverness
 George Lysaght, 4th Baron Lisle (1783–1815), married first to Elizabeth, eldest daughter of Samuel Knight
 Elizabeth, married James Hall
 Catharine, married in 1803 to Thomas Delany Hall

18th-century Irish people
Barons in the Peerage of Ireland
Members of the Parliament of Ireland (pre-1801) for County Cork constituencies
1729 births
Year of death missing